The 1938 Baylor Bears football team represented Baylor University in the Southwest Conference (SWC) during the 1938 college football season. In their 13th season under head coach Morley Jennings, the Bears compiled a 7–2–1 record (3–2–1 against conference opponents), finished in third place in the conference, and outscored opponents by a combined total of 165 to 89. They played their home games at Waco Stadium in Waco, Texas. Sam Boyd and Billy J. Patterson were the team captains.

Schedule

References

Baylor
Baylor Bears football seasons
Baylor Bears football